The list of shipwrecks in 1972 includes ships sunk, foundered, grounded, or otherwise lost during 1972.

January

4 January

9 January

11 January

13 January

17 January

18 January

27 January

February

1 February

4 February

6 February

7 February

11 February

13 February

17 February

18 February

19 February

21 February

23 February

29 February

Unknown date

March

1 March

7 March

8 March

13 March

19 March

April

5 April

6 April

7 April

21 April

22 April

23 April

24 April

May

10 May

11 May

12 May

14 May

18 May

21 May

27 May

June

2 June

9 June

15 June

18 June

25 June

26 June

Unknown date

July

1 July

10 July

13 July

20 July

22 July

Unknown date

August

6 August

9 August

21 August

27 August

September

3 September

4 September

5 September

16 September

19 September

27 September

October

1 October

6 October

11 October

16 October

22 October

24 October

November

1 November

13 November

14 November

19 November

27 November

30 November

December

12 December

15 December

19 December

22 December

24 December

26 December

27 December

Unknown date

Unknown date

References

See also 

1972
 
Ships